Green Business Certification Inc. (GBCI) is an American organization that provides third-party credentialing and verification for several rating systems relating to the built environment.  It was established as the Green Building Certification Institute in January 2008 with the support of the U.S. Green Building Council  to provide independent oversight of the Leadership in Energy and Environmental Design (LEED) project certification and professional credentialing processes. The organization's current name was adopted on 16 April 2015 after the organization starts to provide third-party certification for the International WELL Building Institute's evidence-based building standard WELL Building Standard on 4 April 2014, the Perfect Power Institute's PEER standard, and the Global Real Estate Sustainability Benchmark.

LEED Professional Credentials
The suite of LEED professional credentials was designed to denote leadership in green building and to distinguish building professionals with the knowledge and skills to successfully steward the LEED certification process. Credentialing exams and designations administered by GBCI include the LEED Green Associate, LEED AP with specialty, and LEED Fellow, as well as the LEED for Homes Green Rater and Green Classroom Professional certificates. The LEED professional credential exams are ANSI 17024 accredited.

LEED Project Certification
GBCI administers the LEED certification program, performing third-party technical reviews and verification of LEED-registered projects to determine if they have met the standards set forth by the LEED rating system. As of April 2013, the total footprint of LEED-certified projects is nearly 3 billion square feet, and nearly eight billion additional square feet are registered with GBCI for LEED certification.

See also
LEED
U.S. Green Building Council
LEED Accredited Professional Exam
sustainable architecture
Energy conservation
Environmental design
Renewable energy
Zero energy building
Permaculture
Ecological footprint

References
Notes

External links
Green Certification Bayaweaver
GBCI official website
USGBC official website
FTC Green Guides

Sustainable building in the United States
Organizations established in 2008